The Montreal Insectarium is a natural history museum located in Montreal, Quebec, Canada, featuring a large quantity of insects from all around the world. It is the largest insect museum in North America and among the largest insectariums worldwide. It was founded by Georges Brossard and opened on February 7, 1990. Its average attendance is 400,000 visitors per year. It displays both live and dead insect collections, from butterflies to bees and ants.

It is one of the city's most popular tourist attractions, along with the Montreal Botanical Garden, Montreal Planetarium and the Montreal Biodome.

Seen from the sky, the Montréal Insectarium resembles a stylized insect. This can also be seen from the observatory of Montréal's Olympic Stadium.

Affiliations
The Museum is affiliated with: CMA,  CHIN, and Virtual Museum of Canada.

Photos

See also
International Centre of Insect Physiology and Ecology (in Nairobi in Kenya)
Monsanto Insectarium (in St. Louis in Missouri in the US)

References

External links

Official Website (English version)

Natural history museums in Canada
Insectarium
Zoos in Quebec
Insectariums
Rosemont–La Petite-Patrie
1990 establishments in Quebec
Zoos established in 1990